This is a list of awards that are named after people.

A

B

C

D

E

F

G

H

I

J

K

L

M

N

O

P

R

S

T

U - V

W

Y

Z

See also
Lists of awards
List of eponyms
List of awards named after governors-general of Canada

References

Lists of eponyms
Lists of awards